Graphyllium pentamerum is a species of fungus in  the family Hysteriaceae. It is a plant pathogen infecting wheat.

References

Hysteriales
Fungi described in 1872
Fungal plant pathogens and diseases
Wheat diseases